The 1996 Australian Open was a tennis tournament played on outdoor hard courts at Melbourne Park in Melbourne in Victoria in Australia. It was the 84th edition of the Australian Open and was held from 15 through 28 January 1996.

Seniors

Men's singles

 Boris Becker defeated  Michael Chang 6–2, 6–4, 2–6, 6–2  
 It was Becker's 6th and last career Grand Slam title and his 2nd Australian Open title.

Women's singles

 Monica Seles defeated  Anke Huber 6–4, 6–1 
 It was Seles' 9th and last career Grand Slam title and her 4th Australian Open title.

Men's doubles

 Stefan Edberg /  Petr Korda defeated  Sébastien Lareau /  Alex O'Brien 7–5, 7–5, 4–6, 6–1 
 It was Edberg's 9th and last career Grand Slam title and his 4th Australian Open title. It was Korda's 1st career Grand Slam title and his 1st Australian Open title.

Women's doubles

 Chanda Rubin /  Arantxa Sánchez Vicario defeated  Lindsay Davenport /  Mary Joe Fernández 7–5, 2–6, 6–4 
 It was Rubin's only career Grand Slam title. It was Sánchez Vicario's 12th career Grand Slam title and her 4th and last Australian Open title.

Mixed doubles

 Larisa Neiland /  Mark Woodforde defeated  Nicole Arendt /  Luke Jensen 4–6, 7–5, 6–0 
 It was Neiland's 6th and last career Grand Slam title and her 2nd Australian Open title. It was Woodforde's 11th career Grand Slam title and his 3rd Australian Open title.

Juniors

Boys' singles
 Björn Rehnquist defeated  Mathias Hellstrom 2–6, 6–2, 7–5

Girls' singles
 Magdalena Grzybowska defeated  Nathalie Dechy 6–1, 4–6, 6–1

Boys' doubles
 Daniele Bracciali /  Jocelyn Robichaud defeated  Bob Bryan /  Mike Bryan 3–6, 6–3, 6–3

Girls' doubles
 Michaela Paštiková /  Jitka Schönfeldová defeated  Olga Barabanschikova /  Mirjana Lučić 6–1, 6–3

References

External links
 Australian Open official website

 
 

 
1996 in Australian tennis
January 1996 sports events in Australia
1996,Australian Open